William Smith O'Brien (17 October 1803 – 18 June 1864) was an Irish nationalist Member of Parliament (MP) and a leader of the Young Ireland movement. He also encouraged the use of the Irish language. He was convicted of sedition for his part in the Young Irelander "Famine Rebellion" of 1848 but his sentence of death was commuted to deportation to Van Diemen's Land.  In 1854, he was released on the condition of exile from Ireland, and he lived in Brussels for two years.  In 1856 Smith O'Brien was pardoned and returned to Ireland, but he was never active again in politics.

Early life
Born in Dromoland, Newmarket on Fergus, County Clare, William Smith O'Brien was the second son of Sir Edward O'Brien, 4th Baronet, of Dromoland Castle. His mother was Charlotte Smith, whose father owned a property called Cahirmoyle in County Limerick. William took the additional surname Smith, his mother's maiden name, upon inheriting the property. He lived at Cahermoyle House, a mile from Ardagh, County Limerick. He was a descendant of the eleventh century Ard Rí (High King of Ireland), Brian Boru.
He received an upper-class English education at Harrow School and Trinity College, Cambridge.
Subsequently, he studied law at King's Inns in Dublin and Lincoln's Inn in London.

From April 1828 to 1831 Smith O'Brien was the Tory faction MP for his father's borough, Ennis. Although a Protestant country-gentleman, he supported Catholic Emancipation and  the 1829 Catholic Relief Act while remaining a supporter of British-Irish union.

In 1835 Smith O'Brien became Whig MP for Limerick County. In 1837 Daniel O'Connell  clashed with him over  his opposition to the introduction of secret voting in elections and also Smith O'Brien's support for granting state payments to Catholic clergy. The Catholic Bishops came out in support of O'Connell's stance on Church and nation, resolving "most energetically to oppose any such arrangement, and that they look upon those that labour to effect it as the worst enemies of the Catholic religion."

Smith O'Brien remained in the House of Commons until 1849 when his seat was forfeited.

Young Ireland and the Irish Confederation
In 1843, in protest against the imprisonment of Daniel O'Connell, he joined O'Connell's anti-union Repeal Association. Within the association he identified with the circle around Charles Gavan Duffy and his paper The Nation which O'Connell in hostile reference to Giuseppe Mazzini's anti-clerical and insurrectionary Young Italy dubbed Young Ireland.

After O'Connell and his son John forced a division with resolutions renouncing a resort to revolutionary force regardless of circumstances, Smith O'Brien withdrew with the Young Irelanders into a new Irish Confederation, although he was to continue to preach reconciliation until O'Connell's death in May 1847. The objectives of the Confederation were "independence of the Irish nation" with "no means to attain that end abjured, save such as were inconsistent with honour, morality and reason".

In the Confederation Duffy was trying to hold together a broad national coalition, and had for that reason advanced Smith O'Brien, as a Protestant and a landowner, to the leadership. On the Confederation's Council Duffy and Smith O'Brien were supported by Patrick James Smyth who argued that with propertied classes, as well as the priesthood opposed, the Confederation could not, in the event of insurrection, hope to call out a single parish in Ireland.

As the famine took hold, Smith O'Brien started organising practical relief. By the spring of 1848, the scale of the catastrophe facing the country persuaded all factions on the Irish Confederation Council that independence was an existential issue; that the immediate need was for an Irish national government able take control of national resources. In March 1848, Smith O'Brien called for the formation of a National Guard. He was arrested, but acquitted on a charge of sedition. In May, Duffy published "The Creed of the Nation." If Irish independence was to come by force, it would be in the form of a Republic.

The Government made clear that its chosen response to the crisis in Ireland was coercion not concession. John Mitchel was convicted under new martial law measures approved by Parliament (including by a number of "Old Ireland" O'Connellite MPs). On 9 July 1848 Duffy was arrested for sedition. He managed to smuggle a few lines out to The Nation but the issue that would have carried his declaration, that there was no remedy now but the sword, was seized and the paper suppressed.

Rebellion

Planning for an insurrection had already advanced. Mitchel, although the first to call for action, had scoffed at the necessity for systematic preparation. Smith O'Brien, to Duffy's surprise, attempted the task. In March 1848 Smith O'Brien and Thomas Francis Meagher returned from revolutionary Paris with hopes of French assistance. (Among the leading republicans in France, Ledru-Rollin had been loud in his declaration of French support for the Irish cause). There was also talk of an Irish-American brigade and of a Chartist diversion in England With Duffy's arrest, it was left to Smith O'Brien to confront the reality of the Confederates' domestic isolation.

Having with Meagher and John Dillon gathered a small group of both landowners and tenants, on 23 July Smith O'Brien raised the standard or revolt in Kilkenny. This was a tricolour he and Meagher had brought back from France, its colours (green for Catholics, orange for Protestants) intended to symbolise the United Irish republican ideal.

As Smith O'Brien proceeded into Tipperary he was greeted by curious crowds, but found himself in command of only a few hundred ill-clad largely unarmed men. They scattered after their first skirmish with the constabulary, derisively referred to by The Times of London as "Battle of Widow McCormack's Cabbage Patch".

Conviction

In Smith O'Brien's subsequent trial, the jury found him guilty of high treason.  He was sentenced to be hanged, drawn, and quartered.  Petitions for clemency were signed by 70,000 people in Ireland and 10,000 people in England.

In Dublin on 5 June 1849, the sentences of Smith O'Brien and his confederates Meagher, Terence MacManus and Patrick O'Donoghue were commuted to transportation for life to Van Diemen's Land (Tasmania in present-day Australia).

Smith O'Brien attempted to escape from Maria Island off Tasmania, but was betrayed by Ellis, the captain of the schooner hired for the escape.  He was sent to Port Arthur where he met up with John Mitchel, who had been transported before the rebellion. The cottages which Smith O'Brien lived in on Maria Island and Port Arthur have been preserved in their 19th century state as memorials.

Having emigrated to the United States, Ellis was tried by another Young Irelanders leader, Terence MacManus, at a lynch court in San Francisco for the betrayal of Smith O'Brien.  He was freed for lack of evidence.

In 1854, after five years in Tasmania, Smith O'Brien was released on the condition he never return to the United Kingdom.  He settled in Brussels. In May 1856, he was granted an unconditional pardon and returned to Ireland that July. He contributed to the Nation newspaper, and published the two-volume Principles of Government, or Meditations in Exile in 1856. But despite the efforts of George Henry Moore to recruit him as a leader of the Independent Irish Party, Smith O'Brien played no further part in politics.

In 1864 he visited England and Wales, with the view of rallying his failing health, but no improvement took place, and he died at Bangor, in Wales on 16 June 1864.

Legacy

Quotes
 "The new Irish flag would be Orange and Green, and would be known as the Irish tricolor."
 "To find a gaol in one of the lovliest spots formed by Nature in one of her loneliest solitudes creates a revulsion of feeling I cannot describe." November 1849, when first sighting Maria Island.

Memorial

A statue of William Smith O'Brien stands in O'Connell Street, Dublin. Sculpted in Portland limestone, it was designed by Thomas Farrell and erected in D'Olier Street, Dublin, in 1870. It was moved to its present position in 1929.

Smith O'Brien Avenue in Limerick city is named for him. As is Smith O'Brien's GAA club, in Killaloe, County Clare.

In the United States, O'Brien County, Iowa is named after him.

Irish language
Smith O'Brien was a founding member of the Ossianic Society, whose aim was further the interests of the Irish language and to publish and translate literature relating to the Fianna.

He wrote to his son Edward from Van Diemen's Land, urging him to learn the Irish language. He himself studied the language and used an Irish-language Bible, and presented to the Royal Irish Academy Irish-language manuscripts he had collected. He enjoyed the respect of Clare poets (the county being largely Irish speaking at the time), and in 1863, on his advice, Irish was introduced into a number of schools there.

Family
While studying in London Smith O'Brien met Mary Ann Wilton and fathered two children born to her. In Autumn 1832 he married Lucy Caroline Gabbett (1811–1861) of County Limerick. They had five boys and two girls.

The children of William Smith O'Brien and Lucy O'Brien were Edward William (Ned) (1831–1909), William Joseph (1839–1867), Lucy Josephine (1840–1907), Lucius Henry (1842–1913), Robert Donough (1844–1917), Charlotte Grace (1845–1909) and Charles Murrough (1849–1877). The elder daughter Lucy Josephine O'Brien married Rev John Gwynn and their children included writer and MP Stephen Gwynn, Lucy Gwynn who was the first woman registrar of Trinity College, Dublin, and Edward Gwynn who was Provost of Trinity College, Dublin. O'Brien's younger daughter Charlotte Grace O'Brien was a campaigner for the better treatment of Irish emigrants.

William Smith O'Brien's elder brother Lucius O'Brien (1800–1872) was for some time member of parliament for County Clare.

William Smith O'Brien's sister Harriet O'Brien married an Anglican priest but was soon widowed.  As Harriet Monsell, she founded the order of Anglican nuns, the Community of St John Baptist, in Clewer, Windsor, in 1851.  The gold cross she wore, and which still belongs to the Community, was made with gold panned by her brother during his exile in Australia.

See also
List of convicts transported to Australia

References

Further reading
 
 
Young Ireland and 1848,	Dennis Gwynn,	Cork University Press 1949.
Smith O'Brien And The "Secession", Dennis Gwynn,Cork University Press
The Fenians in Context Irish Politics & Society 1848–82, R. V. Comerford, Wolfhound Press 1998
William Smith O'Brien and the Young Ireland Rebellion of 1848,	Robert Sloan, Four Courts Press 2000
Young Ireland,	T. F. O'Sullivan, The Kerryman Ltd. 1945.

External links

 
 

1803 births
1864 deaths
Convicts transported to Australia
Presidents of the Cambridge Union
UK MPs 1826–1830
UK MPs 1830–1831
UK MPs 1835–1837
UK MPs 1837–1841
UK MPs 1841–1847
UK MPs 1847–1852
Young Irelanders
William
19th-century Irish politicians
Politicians from County Clare
Irish Anglicans
Protestant Irish nationalists
Members of the Parliament of the United Kingdom for County Clare constituencies (1801–1922)
Members of the Parliament of the United Kingdom for County Limerick constituencies (1801–1922)
Convictism in Tasmania
People educated at Harrow School
Alumni of Trinity College, Cambridge
Alumni of King's Inns
Members of Lincoln's Inn
Younger sons of baronets
Committee members of the Society for the Diffusion of Useful Knowledge